Agneepath is a 2012 Indian Hindi-language action drama film produced by Hiroo Yash Johar and Karan Johar under Dharma Productions and directed by Karan Malhotra in his directorial debut. A reboot of the eponymous 1990 film directed by Mukul S. Anand and starring Amitabh Bachchan, it centers on a screenplay written by Malhotra and Ila Dutta Bedi, with dialogues written by Piyush Mishra. The film stars Hrithik Roshan, Sanjay Dutt, Rishi Kapoor, Priyanka Chopra, Kanika Tiwari, Om Puri and Zarina Wahab. It follows Vijay Deenanath Chauhan (Roshan), a common man from the island village of Mandwa who seeks revenge for his father's humiliation and murder at the hands of Kancha Cheena (Dutt); in the process, he befriends Rauf Lala (Kapoor), an underworld gangster, and falls in love with a loquacious girl, Kaali Gawde (Chopra).

Karan Johar had harboured intentions of remaking the original Agneepath ever since its release, which was produced by his father Yash Johar. Despite receiving critical acclaim, the film was a commercial failure and brought Yash to financial ruin. Believing that he was not qualified to direct an action film, Johar approached Malhotra, his associate director on My Name is Khan (2010), to helm the project. He considered the film to be a tribute to his father. Principal photography of Agneepath took place in Diu and Mumbai, with several accidents taking place on the sets. The music of the film was composed by Ajay–Atul, with lyrics written by Amitabh Bhattacharya. As with the original, the title is taken from a poem of the same name by Harivansh Rai Bachchan, which forms a thematic link through the film, both literally and metaphorically.

Agneepath was theatrically released in India on 26 January 2012, coinciding with the Republic Day celebrations, and in 2650 screens worldwide. Critics highlighted Malhotra's direction and Roshan's performance as praiseworthy, with many considering it to be superior to the original film. At the 58th Filmfare Awards, Agneepath received 5 nominations, including Best Actor (Roshan) and Best Supporting Actor (Kapoor). Additionally, it won 5 IIFA Awards and 4 Zee Cine Awards.

Plot 
Within the island village of Mandwa, the school teacher Deenanath Chauhan is highly respected by the villagers. Extremely jealous of Deenanath's popularity in the eyes of the citizens, the village chief summons his evil son Kancha to destroy Deenanath's image in the citizens' eyes. Kancha also has plans to start a drug cartel from Mandwa, knowing that the soil of Mandwa is rich for the cultivation of opium. When Kancha requests the people to lend their lands to him under the pretext of expanding the salt industry of Mandwa, Deenanath dissuades the villagers from doing so. Knowing this, Kancha decides to get rid of the school teacher. He ambushes and murders a young girl inside the school, framing Deenanath for the murder. With the support of the villagers, Kancha then kills Deenanath by hanging him to death from a tree which is witnessed by young Vijay, the son of the teacher. Vijay, along with his pregnant mother Suhasini, leaves the village. The Chauhans find shelter in a chawl in Dongri, a suburb in Mumbai, but Vijay harbors intentions to go back to Mandwa and kill Kancha. While in Mumbai, Suhasini delivers a baby girl named Shiksha, while Vijay befriends a girl, Kaali Gawde. Vijay is fascinated by Rauf Lala, a local human trafficker, and Kancha's nemesis, and gets into his company by refusing to stand as a witness in court to a crime committed by Lala and joins his gang. 

Suhasini takes Shiksha with her upon deserting Vijay's side after he kills Kaali's abusive father at a young age and resorts to violence. A grown-up Vijay now works for Rauf Lala and finds himself as his trusted wingman. Once Inspector and now Commissioner, Eknath Gaitonde, who remembers Vijay from the Lala incident, acts as a silent guardian for Vijay and tries to eliminate crime in Mumbai. When Rauf's influence over the drug business in Mumbai is falling, Kancha decides to grow his influence as a drug lord in the city and sends his aid, Shantaram over to Mumbai for the process. Shantaram succeeds in bribing the Home Secretary of Maharashtra, Mr. Borkar to get access to the interiors of Mumbai for smuggling cocaine. 

Vijay catches Borkar red-handed while trying to smuggle cocaine from Mandwa into Mumbai through his headquarters in Goa. Borkar and Shantaram are forced to hand over the pure cocaine to Lala, thus making them Lala's suppliers rather than rivals. Lala rewards Vijay with the territory of Dongri for his achievement. He further gains Lala's trust by taking a bullet shot which was aimed at Lala's son, Mazhar, this, however, later turns out as a conspiracy involving Vijay and Shantaram to eliminate Mazhar. After having Mazhar shot by Shantaram and subsequently even killing Shantaram himself to eradicate evidence, Vijay brings Mazhar's corpse to Lala, who falls sick and is admitted to a hospital; in the meantime, Vijay takes over Lala's empire and brings all the crimes committed by Lala's gang to an end. All this results in him being contacted by Kancha and invited to Mandwa for a business agreement. 

However, Kancha is taken aback when Vijay mentions that he wants Mandwa in exchange for Mumbai; Vijay's allies and companions are killed, and he is beaten up severely by Kancha, but despite initially suspecting this deal, Kancha later agrees on the condition that Gaitonde must be killed. Meanwhile, back in Mumbai, Lala regains health and finds out the truth behind Mazhar's death. He gets hold of Shiksha and tries to sell her off. Vijay is notified of this by Kancha and he flees back to Mumbai and kills Lala in a bloody skirmish; Shiksha shares an emotional reunion with Vijay as a grown-up Kaali accompanies them. Soon after, Kancha sends Surya, his right-hand man, to aid Vijay in assassinating Gaitonde. However, During the Ganesh Chaturthi, Surya suspects that Vijay is in league with Gaitonde, and sets out to do the deed himself. 

However, when Surya tries to assassinate Gaitonde, he is killed by Vijay, who reveals his credentials before murdering him, amid a crowd. Vijay and Kaali fall in love and get married, but Kaali gets killed right after during a shooting spree by Kancha's men in retaliation for Surya's death. Vijay leaves for Mandwa to avenge the death of Deenanath and Kaali. He destroys the island of Mandwa through explosions and after an intense battle, Kancha almost kills Vijay with a knife, but with all his might, Vijay kills Kancha by hanging him from the same tree in which his father was hanged. However, due to his severe injuries, Vijay is last seen in his mother's and sister's hands passing away whilst seeing a vision of his father and his younger self calling him forward and shouting Agneepath.

Cast

Production

Development 
Karan Johar explained in an interview with The Times of India that he harboured intentions of remaking the original Agneepath ever since its release in 1990. Although the film had received critical acclaim over the years, its commercial failure had devastated his father, producer Yash Johar. Eventually, the idea of a possible remake materialised on the sets of Karan Johar's fourth directorial venture My Name Is Khan, in which Karan Malhotra was his associate director. Johar told Malhotra of his desire to remake the original film and asked him to revisit it again. On not directing the film himself, Johar commented, "I am happy directing films on love, romance, and drama. That's what I do best. I don't think I will be good at an action film. So I am not taking the reins of the film in my hand".
However, Johar maintained that the new film would belong to a different milieu as compared to the original. He stated, "We are adapting the film from the original but ours would be a new age version that would fit in well with today's time. We really hope that we are able to do justice to the original and make the remake exciting for today's generation." Karan dedicated the film to Yash Johar as a tribute. In an interview with Filmfare, he added that the protagonist of the film would be "more of an underdog", while the antagonist would be "more flamboyant and menacing" than the original.

Several changes were made to the storyline of the original film, including the omission of certain characters and the addition of new ones. The characters of Krishnan Iyer M.A., played by Mithun Chakraborty and Nurse Mary Matthew, played by Madhavi were done away with and new characters such as Rauf Lala and Kaali Gawde were introduced in the screenplay. Moreover, the characterisation of Vijay Deenanath Chauhan was changed, unlike the original which was inspired by Al Pacino's role in Scarface (1983). In an interview with The Calcutta Telegraph, Malhotra explained the adaptation by saying, "The similarity (between the original and this film) lies only in the fact that it is a revenge film; a son seeking revenge for his father's death. Unlike Mr. (Amitabh) Bachchan's film, my film starts and ends in Mandwa and is primarily about the conflict between the mother and the son. It's a completely new film with a lot of new characters." He additionally termed Agneepath to be a "crazily dramatic masala Bollywood film".

Casting 
While media reports initially suggested that Abhishek Bachchan was being considered to portray the role of Vijay, Malhotra approached Roshan for the role. Roshan, however, was sceptical on taking up a role earlier played by Amitabh Bachchan and agreed to star in the film only after months of deliberation. He said, "The script had so much passion that I felt very emotional and I made up my mind to do it". On casting Roshan, Malhotra explained, "Hrithik has the charm of a boy and the attitude of a man. Also, he has a certain vulnerability, which I was looking in my characterisation of Vijay Deenanath Chauhan." While explaining the character of Vijay, Malhotra added, "Nobody can play Vijay the way Amitabh Bachchan did, and I would have wanted my Vijay to be subtle even if it wasn't Hrithik. I wanted the negative characters in my film to be bigger. This made Hrithik's victory seem bigger." Roshan did not look up Bachchan's performance in the original for inspiration, as he considered his role to be completely different in Malhotra's vision. However, he faced several difficulties while filming, having suffered from a severe back injury, which caused him considerable pain, throughout the shooting schedule. During an interview with Filmfare he quoted, "Agneepath is the hardest I've ever worked in my life. I didn't know what the film had in store for me. I've never been so tired in my life. I have exhausted my body completely."

Kapoor was subsequently cast as Rauf Lala, an underworld don; alien to the opportunity of playing a completely negative character in his entire career, he was initially hesitant to sign the film. Later, in an interview with Daily News and Analysis he stated that when Malhotra had offered him the role, he considered it to be a joke and thought that he would be the reason for the film's failure. Kapoor subsequently insisted on a test look before principal photography could begin, so that he could comfortably fit into the Muslim character of Lala, who wears kohl in his eyes, a karakul cap and is dressed in traditional kurta-pajamas. While shooting for the action sequences, Kapoor suffered several bad falls and bruises, but continued shooting and was thereby praised by Roshan for his professionalism.

For the role of Kancha, the antagonist, Dutt was cast. According to Malhotra, the script of Agneepath demanded that the villain be more powerful than the hero, and due to Dutt's bulky frame, he was considered perfect for the role. The character of Kancha demanded that Dutt go bald, but due to a prior commitment to the film Son of Sardar, which was being shot simultaneously, he could not do so for the sake of continuity. Therefore, Hollywood make up artist Robin Slater created a "bald" look for Dutt, with the use of prosthetics. However, due to the summer heat in Diu, the make-up would eventually drip down Dutt's face, which impelled him to finally shave his head. Malhotra admitted to being inspired by Marlon Brando's bald look in the film Apocalypse Now (1979) while designing Dutt's character. Dutt explained his look by saying, "Kancha is suffering from an ailment that leaves him hairless. I shaved my head for the role, not once but twice, and the eye-brows and eye-lashes have been digitally removed." Furthermore, Dutt worked out in the gym twice a day in order to bulk up for the role.

During pre-production, media reports suggested that several actresses including Genelia D'Souza, Chopra and Kareena Kapoor were being considered for the role of Kaali Gawde. However, Chopra was approached over the others, and she agreed to do the film instantly. While initial reports suggested that Chopra would be playing the role of a sex worker in the film, they were later denied as rumours; in an interview with Rediff.com, she clarified that she was playing a prostitute's daughter. On Chopra's character, Malhotra commented, "Despite being a male dominated film, the part played by Priyanka Chopra is very prominent. It isn't that of a simple or ordinary lover. She is there for Vijay unconditionally and without any expectations. With all the dangerous people around her, she is like this pretty flower standing there with a smile on her face." Chopra wanted to visit a brothel to prepare for her role, but Malhotra insisted that she don't for safety reasons.

Among the supporting roles, Zarina Wahab was cast as Suhasini Chauhan, Vijay's mother, a role originally played by Rohini Hattangadi. Wahab agreed to do the film due to her close association with producer Johar, who had earlier directed her in a brief role in My Name Is Khan. For the role of Shiksha Chauhan, newcomer Kanika Tiwari from Bhopal was auditioned and cast among 6500 girls. Filming for the song was demanding on Katrina Kaif, as she ended up with cuts and blisters on her feet, due to the long, stretched-out schedules.

Filming 
Principal photography of Agneepath took place in the union territory of Diu, which was used to double as the village of Mandwa. Johar had to complete several formalities before shooting could begin, due to the sensitive nature of the territory. Malhotra, however did not shoot in the port of Mandwa itself, as it was "too congested". While shooting for the film in Mumbai, a picture of Roshan, filming a dahi handi sequence was leaked to the media. Worried over this, Johar increased the security on the sets and banned the use of cell phones. Additionally, Chopra faced difficulties in allocating dates to shoot for the film, as she was simultaneously shooting for Anurag Basu's Barfi!.

According to Malhotra, most of the action stunts in the film were shot by Roshan and Dutt themselves, while body doubles were used to film a few scenes. Several accidents took place during the filming of Agneepath. Chopra's lehenga caught fire, while shooting for an elaborate Ganpati festival song. Roshan too scalded his hands while shooting for the same scene. Roshan also suffered from an eye injury during the shoot of a song, when holi colours were flung into his eyes by some junior artists. During a schedule in October, Roshan suffered from a major back injury while lifting a man weighing 110 kilograms, which was a part of an elaborate action sequence. Shooting was stalled for some time following the incident, while Roshan recuperated in a hospital.

While Ravi K. Chandran was assigned as the cinematographer of Agneepath, he opted out of the film after filming certain portions for unknown reasons. Kiran Deohans was later contracted to replace him. Sabu Cyril was contracted as the production designer for the film, along with a team of 200 people. He explained the creation of Kancha's den by saying that he built a haveli-like structure with tantric paintings on the walls, resembling an old fort built by the Portuguese (who had historically occupied Diu). Vijay's home, on the other hand, was a "small sack-like thing" on the terrace of a chawl, which was built on open ground with a hundred houses. Cyril added, "We wanted a tree to be at the edge of a hillside, protruding out due to erosion, with not enough soil. We made this banyan tree with fibre as we wanted it to have a particular look." This tree forms a visual thread to represent Kancha's atrocities in the film. The song "Chikni Chameli" featuring Kaif was shot in Film City, Mumbai, where the entire set of Dutt's villa was recreated.

Soundtrack 

The music of Agneepath was composed by Ajay–Atul, with lyrics written by Amitabh Bhattacharya. The songs were composed with the help of live instrumentation being extensively used. While explaining the process involved in composing the soundtrack, Ajay said that Malhotra narrated the story to them for over four hours, whilst humming the background score that he wanted. This was followed by innumerable discussions which made them "understand each other well". He also mentioned that the song "Chikni Chameli" was a remake of their own Marathi song "Kombdi Palali" from the film Jatra (2006).

Themes and analysis 
Agneepath derives its name from a poem of the same name written by Harivansh Rai Bachchan. The poem, which is recited through the film provides a metaphorical link to represent Vijay's quest for vengeance. Several critics consider Agneepath to be a homage to the era of the melodramatic, over-the-top action films of the 1980s and 90s. Critic Rajeev Masand analysed, "Agneepath is a throwback to those heightened action dramas of the 90s, so every dialogue is delivered as a punch-line; our hero may be battered and stabbed, yet he'll rise like the Phoenix, and the women are flung around to be raped or sold as sex slaves." He added, "The film is enhanced by uncompromising, brutal action, and by its striking camerawork, especially those scenes framed against a monsoon sky, heavy with dark clouds." Writing for Hindustan Times, Mayank Shekhar explained that the film, like several other Bollywood films, was inspired by the Indian epic tale of the Ramayana. He also added that "the external logic of a star-driven, fantasy fed film" would "not be easy to gulp for many." While writing a critique for Deccan Chronicle, Suparna Sharma quoted, "Agneepath is more than a remake or a homage to the original. It's about a son righting a wrong and this emotion makes us connect with the film immediately."

Marketing 
The first official trailer of Agneepath was launched at a press conference in Mumbai on 29 August 2011. Dharma Productions streamed the event live on the production house's YouTube channel. The event was attended by the entire cast: Roshan, Kapoor, Dutt and Chopra. The trailer of the film was the third most watched trailer in India, behind the films, Don 2 and Ra.One.

Additionally, few winners were offered a chance to win a lunch date with Roshan. As part of the promotional campaign, Roshan, Dutt and Chopra visited Dubai on 19 January 2012, to interact with fans at a shopping mall, followed by an invitational high tea party. The actors travelled to several places in India including New Delhi, Nagpur and other cities to promote the film.

Release 
Prior to its theatrical release, the Central Board of Film Certification (CBFC) certified the film with a UA certificate after demanding a few cuts, due to a high proportion of violence present in the film. Explaining the certificate, Pankaja Thakur, CEO of CBFC stated, "Agneepath has a lot of bloodsheds but none of us felt disturbed by it. The violence is not the type that can psychologically damage a child and the softer scenes of the film managed to offset the darker part of it". The film's posters subsequently featured disclaimers reading, "This film is certified U/A. We advise parental guidance due to violence in the film." The board consequently praised Johar for the step.

Initially scheduled to release on 28 December 2011, Agneepath was postponed by a week to 26 January to coincide with the Republic Day celebrations. The film eventually released at around 2650 screens worldwide. Somehow, this meant that the deal would appear in later stages, and after Baar Baar Dekho being one of the films, several films produced by the studio in 2017, 2018 and 2019 would be sold to Zee TV. Dharma Productions released the DVD of Agneepath on 13 March 2012 across all regions in the NTSC format, with a censor rating of PG-13. The DVD includes special features such as the "making of the film" and "deleted scenes and songs". It is available in Dolby Digital 5.1 and Stereo format with English and Arabic subtitles presented in 16:9 anamorphic widescreen. The film is now available on Netflix and Amazon Prime Video, with its renewed satellite rights now owned by Viacom 18.

Reception

Critical reception

India 
Upon release, Agneepath received positive reviews from film critics in India. Taran Adarsh of Bollywood Hungama gave the film a score of 4.5 out of 5, and said, "Agneepath is an uncomplicated story of revenge, is hard-hitting yet entertaining, dwells on strong emotions and aggressive and forceful action, yet is dissimilar from the original. It is a fitting tribute to the masterwork." Subhash K. Jha of IANS gave it 4 out of 5 stars, while commenting, "Every component of the film falls into place, with a resounding thump. Agneepath is brilliant in its brutality. It's a riveting and hectic homage to the spirit of the cinema when revenge reigned supreme. And content was king. This new Agneepath takes us back to the era when there was no computer or cellphones. And communication with the audience was immediate and electrifying." Kaveree Bamzai of India Today rated the film 4 out of 5, noting, "Melodramatic, choir-inducing sentiment, ecstatic. Agneepath is that rare mainstream movie written well."

Aniruddha Guha of Daily News and Analysis gave the film 3.5 out of 5, reviewing, "An adaptation rather than a remake, the film assumes a life of its own once the central plot has been established. The film then charts a journey of his own." Piyali Dasgupta of NDTV gave it 3.5 out of 5, stating "Watch this film because this one is unadulterated Bollywood entertainment." Daily Bhaskar gave the film 3.5 out of 5 stars, while adding, "On the whole, Agneepath totally rests on star power which will lure the cine-goers to halls but how far will it impress them remains to be seen."

Avijit Ghosh of The Times of India gave the film 3 stars out of 5, and said, "Try to wipe out the movie's earlier version from your mind. You might find it more enjoyable." Sukanya Verma of Rediff gave it 3 out of 5, while commenting, "Agneepath, less of a remake, more of a tribute. The makers of Agneepath should have just called it Dharmapath." Kunal Guha of Yahoo.com gave the film 3 out of 5 stars, saying that, "The biggest dilemma of remaking a movie is how much to retain and what to retain. If the new story takes violent shifts, you lose the audience who came to revisit the original. If you photocopy scene-by-scene, you risk failing to connect with the audience who is accustomed to present sensibilities. The only safe bet: a 'khichdi' of the past and the present, like this one."
Mayank Shekhar of Hindustan Times gave the film 3 out of 5 stars while remarking, "This is the kind of genuine theatre experience, now getting rare, which remains most precious in the life of a film-goer. Reason can take over later. I had a ball!" Sonia Chopra of Sify gave it 3 out of 5, and mentioned, "Debut director Karan Malhotra shows great promise in making the film visually arresting and maintaining the consistency of performances. But remaking a cult film means you have big shoes to fill. If you're a loyalist of the late Mukul Anand's Agneepath, you're likely to have reservations with this one. But if you leave the comparisons aside and are willing to forgive the faults, Agneepath is worth a watch essentially to savor Hrithik's performance." Rajeev Masand of CNN-IBN gave Agneepath 3 out of 5 and said, "It is in the end, an old-fashioned revenge drama treated in that melodramatic, over-the-top style. You're not likely to be bored by the intense action and the solid performances, but prepare to be exhausted by just how long this film plays on."

Overseas 
Overseas, the film received positive reviews. Russel Edwards of Variety reviewed, "Debuting helmer Karan Malhotra stokes up a fiery revenge tale in Agneepath, an expensively pumped-up, relentlessly energetic retelling of the 1990 Amitabh Bachchan cult favorite of the same name. Toplining Bollywood hunk Hrithik Roshan and veteran actor Sanjay Dutt donning the hat as the antagonist, this dynamic Hindi action extravaganza boosts its potent story with an aggressive style that will ensure audiences feel every blow." Farah Andrews of Gulf News praised the film while saying, "Fans of the 1990 original starring Amitabh Bachchan and Danny Denzongpa as Vijay and Kancha may be wary about the remake, but take it from us, the revamped flick is well worth a watch." Rabina A. Khan of The First Post wrote, "Director Karan Malhotra has made an impressive film under the able guidance of his mentor, Karan Johar. It scores on all directorial aspects – design, sound, edit, costumes, camera, a phenomenal cast, dialogues, and a very gripping screenplay."

Box office 
Subsequently, the film netted  over its extended four-day weekend. It netted  on Tuesday and another  nett on Wednesday. The movie brought its first-week total to  nett, thereby emerging as a major commercial success.

The film collected  in its second week, thus taking its two-week total to  nett. Agneepath was thus declared a "superhit". Agneepath has collected  in its lifetime run in India.

After a successful opening in the domestic market, Agneepath made  in its four-day weekend, overseas. At the time of release, the film holds the record for the twelfth largest opening ever internationally. The film has grossed around $6 million in overseas markets.

Awards and nominations

References

External links 

 Official website
 
 
 
 Agneepath at Bollywood Hungama

2012 films
2010s Hindi-language films
Remakes of Indian films
Films about organised crime in India
Indian films about revenge
Films shot in Maharashtra
2012 action drama films
Films shot in Daman and Diu
Films shot in Mumbai
Fictional portrayals of the Maharashtra Police
Films scored by Ajay–Atul
Indian action drama films
2012 directorial debut films
Hindi-language action films
Films directed by Karan Malhotra